Amy Lyndon (born October 15, 1965) is an American actress and acting coach.

Early life and Education 

Lyndon was born in New Rochelle, New York and studied with Stella Adler at the Stella Adler Conservatory and with Sanford Meisner at the Neighborhood Playhouse in New York City. She is an acting teacher and author of The Lyndon Technique: The 15 Guideline Map To Booking. The Lyndon Technique is part of the curriculum at the University of Kansas and was included as part of the Aaron Sorkin Week through Syracuse University.

Career 

Lyndon’s works in film include The UnMiracle with Stephen Baldwin and the Lionsgate feature films Bram Stoker's Dracula's Guest and Chicago Massacre: Richard Speck. Lyndon also starred in Chris Pratt's first film, Cursed Part 3, written and directed by Rae Dawn Chong.

She has appeared in many television shows, including Days Of Our Lives, The Bold and the Beautiful and The Young and The Restless. Lyndon also appeared as a recurring guest lead on the American horror anthology television series, Freddy's Nightmares. Additionally, Lyndon directed Odessa starring Yolanda King.

References 

Living people
1965 births
Actresses from New Rochelle, New York
20th-century American actresses
21st-century American actresses
American acting coaches